Lucian Boia (born 1 February 1944 in Bucharest) is a Romanian historian. He is mostly known for his debunking of historical myths about Romania, for purging mainstream Romanian history from the deformations due to ideological propaganda. I.e. as a fighter against pseudohistory.

Awards
 2018 – Order of Merit of the Federal Republic of Germany in rank of knight
 2020 – Knight's Cross of the Order of Merit of the Republic of Hungary

Works
 Eugen Brote: (1850–1912) Litera, 1974
 Relationships between Romanians, Czechs and Slovaks: (1848–1914), translated by Sanda Mihailescu, Editura Academiei Republicii Socialiste România, 1977
L'exploration imaginaire de l'espace, La Découverte, 1987 ISBN, 2707117269
La fin du monde, La Découverte, 1989
 Sfîrşit, translated by Walter Fotescu, Humanitas, 1999 
 Great Historians from Antiquity to 1800: An International Dictionary (editor-in-chief), Greenwood Press, 1989 
 Great Historians of the Modern Age: An International Dictionary (editor-in-chief), Greenwood Press, 1991
 Mituri istorice româneşti, Editura Universităţii București, 1995
 Entre l'ange et la bete: le mythe de l'homme different de l'Antiquite a nos jours, Plon, Paris, 1995
 Între înger şi fiară: mitul omului diferit din Antichitate pînă astăzi, translated by Brînduşa Prelipceanu and Lucian Boia, Humanitas, 2004
 Entre El Angel y La Bestia, Andres Bello, 1997, 
 Miturile comunismului românesc, Editura Universităţii din București, 1995, 1997; Nemira 1998 
 Istorie şi mit în conştiinţa românească, Humanitas, 1997, 2000, 2002
 Történelem és mítosz a román köztudatban, translated by András János, Kriterion, Bukarest/Kolozsvár, 1999
 Pour une histoire de l'imaginaire, Les Belles Lettres, Paris, 1998
 Pentru o istorie a imaginarului, translated by Tatiana Mochi, Humanitas, 2000, 2006
 Jocul cu trecutul: istoria între adevăr şi ficţiune, Humanitas, 1998, 2002
 Două secole de mitologie naţională, Humanitas, 1999, 2002, 2005
 La Mythologie scientifique du communisme, Belles Lettres, 2000
 Mitologia ştiinţifică a comunismului, Humanitas, 1999, 2005
 România, ţară de frontieră a Europei Humanitas, 2002, 2005
 Romania: borderland of Europe, translated by James Christian Brown; Reaktion Books, London, 2001
 La Roumanie: un pays a la frontière de l'Europe, translated by Laurent Rossion, Les Belles Lettres, Paris, 2003
 Rumunsko — krajina na hranici Európy, translated into Slovak by Hildegard Bunčáková, Kalligram, Bratislava, 2012
 Le mythe de la démocratie, Les Belles Lettres, Paris, 2002
 Mitul Democraţiei, Humanitas, 2003
 Quand les centenaires seront jeunes : L'imaginaire de la longétivité de l'Antiquité à nos jours, Les Belles Lettres, Paris, 2006
 Mitul longevităţii: cum să trăim două sute de ani, translated by Walter Fotescu, Humanitas, 1999
 Forever Young: A Cultural History of Longevity, translated by Trista Selous, Hushion House, 2004
 Jules Verne: Les paradoxes d'un mythe, Les Belles Lettres, Paris, 2005
 Jules Verne: paradoxurile unui mit, Humanitas, 2005
 L'homme face au climat: l'imaginaire de la pluie et du beau temps, Les Belles Lettres, Paris, 2004
 Omul şi clima: teorii, scenarii, psihoze, translated by Valentina Nicolaie, Humanitas, 2005
 The Weather in the Imagination, Reaktion Books, 2005
 De ce este Romania altfel?, Humanitas, 2012 
 Miért más Románia?, translated by István Rostás-Péter, Koinónia, Kolozsvár, 2013
 Cum s-a românizat România, Humanitas, 2015

See also 

 Dacianism

References

External links
 Author profile, at Shelfari

1944 births
19th-century Romanian historians
20th-century Romanian historians
Historians of Romania
Living people
Recipients of the Cross of the Order of Merit of the Federal Republic of Germany
Romanian writers in French
Scientific skepticism
University of Bucharest alumni
Academic staff of the University of Bucharest